James Slack  is a British political advisor and journalist who served as Downing Street Director of Communications for Prime Minister Boris Johnson between January and March 2021.

Career 
Previously home affairs editor of the Daily Mail, he was appointed political editor of the newspaper in October 2015 in succession to James Chapman, who had been appointed as spokesman for George Osborne, then Chancellor of the Exchequer.

At the Daily Mail, as home affairs editor, Slack was involved in the campaign to stop Gary McKinnon, who suffers from Asperger syndrome, from being extradited to the United States to face charges relating to computer hacking. 

Slack wrote the controversial "Enemies of the People" front-page article on 4 November 2016 which criticised senior judges in England's High Court of Justice who had made a decision the Daily Mail did not agree with.

At the end of January 2017 it appeared that Slack was to be appointed as the Prime Minister's Official Spokesperson, which was confirmed on 10 February 2017. He remained in the post after Boris Johnson took over the government on 24 July 2019.

Slack was appointed a Commander of the Order of the British Empire in Theresa May's resignation honours list for public service.

Following the announcement that the then-Downing Street Director of Communications, Lee Cain, had resigned from government and would leave his post at the end of December 2020 it was confirmed that Slack would assume this position in the new year.

In March 2021, it was announced that he was leaving Downing Street to join  The Sun as deputy editor in succession to Keith Poole. He was replaced as Director of Communications by Jack Doyle, a former Daily Mail associate editor for politics.

On 13 January 2022, The Daily Telegraph reported on two parties alleged to have been held at 10 Downing Street in April 2021, on the eve of the funeral of Prince Philip, Duke of Edinburgh, when the UK was observing a period of national mourning following the Duke's death the previous week, and as England remained in step two lockdown restrictions, where people were only permitted to meet up outdoors. These were leaving events for Slack and for a photographer. The next day, Slack and Downing Street confirmed there was an event, with Slack apologising for what happened.

See also 
Westminster lockdown parties controversy

References

Living people
British political journalists
Daily Mail journalists
The Sun (United Kingdom) people
Year of birth missing (living people)
Commanders of the Order of the British Empire